Tome and Blood: A Guidebook to Wizards and Sorcerers is an optional rulebook for the 3rd edition of Dungeons & Dragons, and notable for its trade paperback format.

Contents
The guidebook provides supplemental information for characters belonging to the Wizard and Sorcerer base classes. This book contained tips for creating and playing characters of the aforementioned class, as well as a large number of prestige classes.

Tome and Blood includes 15 prestige classes.
Acolyte of the Skin
Alienist
Arcane Trickster
Bladesinger
Blood Magus

Candle Caster
Dragon Disciple
Elemental Savant
Fatespinner
Mage of the Arcane Order

Mindbender
Pale Master
Spellsword
True Necromancer
Wayfarer Guide

Publication history
Tome and Blood was published in 2001 by Wizards of the Coast, and was designed by Bruce R. Cordell and Skip Williams. Cover art was by Todd Lockwood, with interior art by Wayne Reynolds.

The book was not updated to 3.5 Edition, although most of the prestige classes were later reintroduced in the 3.5 supplemental sourcebook Complete Arcane.

Reception
The reviewer from Pyramid commented that "In some ways, the theme of Tome And Blood could be everything old is new again." The reviewer cited the example of the Arcane Order, originally found in the 2nd edition book The College of Wizardry, by Bruce R. Cordell.

See also
Defenders of the Faith
Masters of the Wild
Song and Silence
Sword and Fist

References

External links
Product page at wizards.com

Handbooks and manuals